Eva Birnerová was the defending champion, but chose not to participate.
Mona Barthel won the title, defeating Heather Watson 6–0, 6–3 in the final.

Seeds

Main draw

Finals

Top half

Bottom half

References
 Main Draw
 Qualifying Draw

Aegon GB Pro-Series Shrewsbury - Singles